Iqwinder Gaheer (born July 12, 1993) is a Canadian politician who was elected to represent the riding of Mississauga—Malton in the House of Commons of Canada in the 2021 Canadian federal election.

Early life and career
Gaheer was born in Punjab, India to Maninder Singh, a construction worker and plumber, and Baljit Kaur, a home-maker. Gaheer's father had immigrated to Canada in 1992. He and the rest of his family joined his father in Canada in 1999. Describing his early life, the Toronto Star wrote, "Gaheer has a compelling, almost made for politics, story. He was born in a small village in the Punjab. He moved to Canada when he was six years old. He spent his summers growing up in Peel working on his father’s plumbing crew."

Gaheer graduated from Bramalea Secondary School in Brampton. After completing high school, Gaheer attended the Schulich School of Business, York University where he received his Bachelor of Business Administration. He then went on to attend Harvard Law School from 2016 to 2019, where he served as Editor-in-Chief of the Harvard Human Rights Journal. Beginning in September 2019, Gaheer worked in New York City, in the litigation department of Kirkland & Ellis LLP, a large international corporate law firm.

Political career
In his first election in 2021, Gaheer won the Liberal nomination for the riding of Mississauga—Malton by acclamation, and won the seat with approximately 53% of the total vote; beating his next nearest opponent by over 9000 votes.

Electoral record

References

External links

1993 births
Living people
Liberal Party of Canada MPs
Members of the House of Commons of Canada from Ontario
Politicians from Mississauga
York University alumni
Harvard Law School alumni
21st-century Canadian politicians
People associated with Kirkland & Ellis